Early Man is an American heavy metal duo from Brooklyn, New York, now based in Los Angeles.

History 
Guitarist and vocalist Mike Conte began performing under the name "Early Man" in the early 2000s, and when drummer Adam Bennati moved to New York in 2003, the two formed the nucleus for the current lineup. Drawing influence from bands such as Black Sabbath, Mercyful Fate, Megadeth, Judas Priest, Kreator, Celtic Frost, and early Metallica, their traditional approach quickly gained the attention of the independent music scene and they released their first EP in early 2005 on Monitor Records. Matador Records quickly signed them and released their debut album, Closing In, in the fall of the same year. Lead guitarist Pete Macy was added to the band's lineup in 2005. The band has used several bass players over the years and at times will perform without one.

The band cut ties with Matador Records and signed with The End Records in 2008. They released Beware the Circling Fin, a four-song EP, on October 14, 2008, and toured with Iced Earth, High on Fire, 3 Inches of Blood, Toxic Holocaust, Skeletonwitch, and Valient Thorr soon after. The follow-up to the group's debut album is entitled Death Potion. It was recorded and produced by Jack Endino. Death Potion was released on July 20, 2010, and the band did a fall tour with Evile and Bonded by Blood. Prior to the tour, Adam Bennati announced his departure from the band. The band is currently using various touring drummers for live shows.

In July 2011, it was announced that Mike Conte is the Composer for a new show debuting on the Cartoon Network called Secret Mountain Fort Awesome. Conte is in charge of all of the music for the show which premiered in the fall of 2011.

Discography

Studio albums
Closing In (October 11, 2005)
Death Potion (July 20, 2010)
Thank God You've Got the Answers for Us All (October 10, 2014)

Singles
 2005: "Death Is the Answer"
 2008: "Tormentor of the Unseen", split 7-inch with Rammer

Soundtrack songs
 2007: "More to Me Than Meat and Eyes", from the film Aqua Teen Hunger Force
 2007: "Feeding Frenzy", from the video game MLB 07: The Show
 2007: "Evil Is", from the video game NHL 2K8

References

External links 

Early Man Facebook page

Heavy metal musical groups from Ohio
Musical groups established in 2003
Musical groups from New York (state)